Nkwazi Football Club is a Zambian football club based in Lusaka. They play in the Zambian Premier League, after gaining promotion from Division One South in 2014. Their home stadium is Edwin Imboela Stadium. The club is sponsored by the Zambia Police Service and has a mix of players that includes Police officers and ordinary Civilians (non police officers) .

References

Football clubs in Zambia
Association football clubs established in 1978
1978 establishments in Zambia